Idalia Lechuga-Tena is a Mexican-born American politician who served as a member of the New Mexico House of Representatives for the 21st district from November 18, 2015 to January 2017.

Early life and education 
Lechuga-Tena was born in Mexico and raised in Albuquerque, New Mexico. She earned a Bachelor of Arts degree in economics and political science from the University of New Mexico.

Career 
Lechuga-Tena worked on the unsuccessful mayoral campaign of Pete Dinelli and was a legislative analyst for the New Mexico House of Representatives Majority Office. She was also an assistant to Mayor Martin Chávez and was the communications director for the New Mexico Medicaid Electronic Health Records Incentive Program.

Lechuga-Tena was appointed to the New Mexico House of Representatives in November 2015 and served for one term. In 2016, she was defeated for re-election by Debra M. Sariñana. In 2020, she was a candidate for the 20th district of the New Mexico Senate, placing third in the Democratic primary.

After Melanie Stansbury was elected to the United States House of Representatives in June 2021, Lechuga-Tena declared her candidacy to succeed her in the New Mexico House of Representatives.

Personal life 
Lechuga-Tena is married to Marco Gonzales, an attorney. In 2018, Gonzales acted as Lechuga-Tena's lawyer after she was barred from running for the New Mexico House of Representatives due to a residency violation.

References 

Hispanic and Latino American state legislators in New Mexico
Hispanic and Latino American women in politics
American politicians of Mexican descent
Living people
People from Albuquerque, New Mexico
University of New Mexico alumni
Women state legislators in New Mexico
Democratic Party members of the New Mexico House of Representatives
Year of birth missing (living people)
21st-century American women